Niels Jörgen Philip-Sörensen (born 23 September 1938 in Malmö, died 18 January 2010 in London) was a Swedish businessman of Danish ancestry.

Philip-Sörensen led the demerger of Group 4 from Securitas AB in 1981. He went on to become Chairman of Group 4 and then of G4S before he retired in 2006. In later years, Jörgen Philip-Sörensen lived in England, where he was among the nation's wealthiest individuals. Sometimes he visited Skagen in his father's native Denmark, where he owned Ruth's Hotel.

See also
Ecover

References

20th-century Swedish businesspeople
20th-century Danish businesspeople
People from Malmö
1938 births
2010 deaths